Deadly Eyes (also known as The Rats, Rats and Night Eyes) is a 1982 Canadian horror film directed by Robert Clouse, very loosely based on the 1974 horror novel The Rats by James Herbert. The story revolves around giant black rats who begin eating the residents of Toronto after ingesting contaminated grain.

Plot 
The plot and subplots center on the movie's leading man, Paul Harris, a divorced high school teacher and basketball coach and his interactions during a killer rat infestation with a health department inspector, Kelly Leonard, a high school cheerleader, Trudy White, his friend a professor and rat expert, Dr. Louis Spenser, and his students.

Giant rats the size of small dogs living in mountains of grain full of steroids are rendered homeless when Kelly orders it to be burned down. The Rats migrate to a suburban home occupied by unsupervised high school students. The rats begin to kill a toddler left unattended in a high chair.  Henry Younger, a senior citizen was attacked by the rats, walking the snowy streets alone late at night. George Foskins, a health department field inspector, is destined to become the next victim. Inspecting the bowels of the city's sewer system, he encounters a pack of the rats.  George commences with 'the running of the rats' in the sewer, followed by his demise.

Paul telephones his friend, Louis, who instantly concludes that the steroid feed had spawned a new breed of 'super-rat' that had migrated into the sewers in search of food. Upon hearing this information, the Health Inspector immediately orders the fumigation of the entire city sewer system, which is immediately and efficiently carried out with no apparent effect. The futility of this action is confirmed when the rat expert himself is attacked and killed. The rats then move on to a bowling alley and a movie theater and make their first brazen mass attack on the unsuspecting public. The rats select the viewers of a Bruce Lee movie, resulting in numerous deaths, including Trudy, and a scene of fleeing film patrons.

Meanwhile, the city's mayor, Rizetti, prepares to make an inaugural run of a new subway section—straight into a hungry pack of rats. While escaping the rats, and sacrificing the other delegates, Mayor Rizetti stows away on the empty subway train. Paul attempts to stop the festivities. He is forced to assault a cop and take his revolver. Paul proceeds down the tunnel and finds a disabled subway train, with passengers just emerging from the cars.

Paul finds Kelly and his son just as the rats attack the passengers and Mayor Rizetti is killed by the rats off-screen. The three are able to escape down the tunnel and find refuge in a fenced-in maintenance area, which is the rats' nest. They discover cutting torches and drums of flammable liquids and soon, the three escape from the tunnel as the rats are killed during a flammable explosion behind him. After the three survivors re-board the subway train to reach safety, the train reaches the platform and the party-goers for the new subway section approach the train and to their shock, it is revealed that the three had boarded the same train as Mayor Rizetti did, which shows a small amount of surviving rats eating the body of the mayor, as the final scene shows a bloody rat hissing at the train window.

Cast 
 Sam Groom as Paul Harris
 Sara Botsford as Kelly Leonard
 Scatman Crothers as George Foskins
 Cec Linder as Dr. Spenser
 Lisa Langlois as Trudy White
 Lesleh Donaldson as Martha

Production 
Originally a British-set fiction novel, Deadly Eyes was instead set in Toronto, Canada, with scenic shots in the subway tunnels and snowy streets. Despite its Canadian setting, promotional posters sometimes featured images of a New York City skyline, complete with the then-iconic Twin Towers of the World Trade Center. Rather than using actual rats in the film, dachshunds wearing rat suits were used to achieve the effect of super-sized rodents.

American singer Chuck McDermott, along with the Chuck McDermott Band, recorded two folk rock songs for the soundtrack, both of which were used throughout the film: "Lolita" and "So Right". While credited by title at the end of the film, fans widely consider these songs to be lost media. "So Right" was released commercially on the B-side of McDermott's The Turning of the Wheel, while "Lolita" remains lost media with no known commercial release. Robert Clouse heavily featured the usage of his own 1978 Bruce Lee film Game of Death (a spin-off of the unfinished 1972 film Game of Death) in a gory theatre scene, as well as footage from an American children's educational television show called Curiosity Shop, and B.C.: A Special Christmas, which coincidentally had been airing in 1981, during the production of Deadly Eyes.

Critical reception 
James Herbert, who wrote the novel upon which the film was based, was displeased with what the filmmakers did to his story, and described it as "terrible ... absolute rubbish." The film also has a 29% on Rotten Tomatoes, considered a poor critical reception, with Jeff Beck of Examiner stating, "with its overly-familiar story and a group of characters that you merely hope will soon become rat food, Deadly Eyes makes for a somewhat tedious viewing experience", and Mike McGranaghan of Aisle Seat criticizing the film's "underdeveloped characters and stilted dialogue." Despite this, Deadly Eyes has since received a cult following, with fans praising the acting of Scatman Crothers, the Chuck McDermott songs and the distinct Canadian setting, as well as the unintentional comedic aspects; Paul Freitag-Fey of Daily Grindhouse stated, "a goofy film, but one that's never dull and certainly entertaining enough to warrant the recent occasional cult reputation it's built." He also praised Deadly Eyes from a feminist standpoint, saying of the film, "the lead female characters manage to be something relatively rare in a horror film – women that have sexuality and power but don’t come off like dominatrixes or archetypical “slut” characters that exist as grist for the nudity mill."

Remake 

A 2002 remake of Deadly Eyes titled The Rats was written by Frank Deasy and directed by Child's Play franchise writer John Lafia, set in New York City. The remake was set to be released in September 2001, but was pushed back for editing due to featuring multiple scenic shots of the World Trade Center in the background, which were subsequently removed after the September 11th Attacks.

References

External links

Bibliography

1982 films
1982 horror films
English-language Canadian films
Films based on British novels
Warner Bros. films
Golden Harvest films
Films set in Toronto
Canadian natural horror films
1980s English-language films
1980s Canadian films